Hibbertia axillibarba is a species of flowering plant in the family Dilleniaceae and is endemic to a restricted area of the south-west of Western Australia. It is a shrub with crowded narrow oblong to linear leaves. Its yellow flowers are arranged singly on short side shoots with ten or eleven stamens fused at their bases on one side of the two densely hairy carpels.

Description
There are ten or eleven stamens, fused at the base and all on one side of the two carpels that each contain two ovules. Flowering occurs from July to October.

Taxonomy
Hibbertia axillibarba was first formally described in 2000 by Judith R. Wheeler in the journal Nuytsia from specimens she collected at South Ironcap, east of Hyden in 1999. The specific epithet (axillibarba) is derived from Latin words meaning "an axil" and "a beard", referring to hairs in the leaf axils.

Distribution and habitat
This hibbertia grows in heath and shrubland on laterite and is only known from near the type location.

Conservation status
Goodenia axillibarba is classified as "Priority One" by the Government of Western Australia Department of Parks and Wildlife, meaning that it is known from only one or a few locations which are potentially at risk.

See also
List of Hibbertia species

References

axillibarba
Flora of Western Australia
Plants described in 2000